Rudolph T. Ware III is an historian of West Africa, at the University of California, Santa Barbara. He formerly taught at the University of Michigan and before then at Northwestern University. His work aims to confront and dispel Western misconceptions about Islam. He received his Ph.D. in history in 2004 from the University of Pennsylvania.

Selected publications

 Jihad of the Pen: Sufi Thought in West Africa by Rudolph Ware, Zakary Wright, Amir Syed. American University in Cairo Press, 2018. 
 The Walking Qur'an Islamic Education, Embodied Knowledge, and History in West Africa. University of North Carolina Press, Chapel Hill, 2014.  
 "The Longue Durée Of Quran Schooling, Society, And State In Senegambia" in New Perspectives on Islam in Senegal. Springer, pp. 21–50.

References

External links
Faculty website 
 https://www.lamppostproductions.com/key-lessons-from-islamic-west-african-tradition-dr-rudolph-bilal-ware/
https://www.nypl.org/audiovideo/rudolph-ware-and-christopher-brown?nref=90283

21st-century American historians
21st-century American male writers
Historians of Africa
American historians of Islam
University of Michigan faculty
University of Pennsylvania alumni
American Muslims
Year of birth missing (living people)
Living people
American male non-fiction writers